Qazvin University of Medical Sciences (QUMS) is a medical school in Qazvin Province of Iran.

Located in northwest of Tehran in the city of Qazvin, the university was established in 1984, and fell under the Ministry of Health and Medical Education in 1986.

The university offers degrees in 4 schools including residencies and fellowships, and administers all major hospitals and clinics throughout the city and province of Qazvin.

See also
Higher Education in Iran

External links
Official website

Q*
Q*
Educational institutions established in 1984
Education in Qazvin Province
1984 establishments in Iran
Buildings and structures in Qazvin Province